Phantom: The Submarine is a 1999 South Korean film directed by Min Byung-chun.

Plot
South Korea's first nuclear-powered submarine, Phantom, is sent on a reconnaissance mission off the coast of Japan.

References

1999 films
Films about the Republic of Korea Navy
South Korean drama films